Sione Jongstra (born 5 February 1976 in Ruinen, Drenthe) is a Dutch triathlete.

Jongstra, born in Ruinen and currently residing in Leerdam performed in artistic gymnastics, swimming, football and tennis, before making the step to focus completely on triathlon in 1996.

Honours

2002
1st Dutch national championships (Nieuwkoop) - half triathlon
1st Dutch national championships (Soesterberg) - duathlon
8th World Championships (Nice) - long distance
1st Enschede - quarter triathlon
1st Groningen - Olympic distance
2nd Stein - quarter triathlon
1st Eupen - half marathon

2003
3rd World Championships age group 25-29 (Queenstown) - Olympic distance
9th World Championships (Queenstown) - aquathlon
2nd Assen-  winter triathlon
1st Dutch national championships (Stein) - long distance
3rd European Championships (Fredericia) - long distance
3rd World Championships (Ibiza) - long distance
1st Nijeveen - Olympic distance
1st Groningen - triathlon
1st Lage - triathlon
1st Xanten - triathlon

2004
1st Assen - duathlon
3rd Knokke - triathlon
6th Shelbourne - half ironman
2nd Embrun - quarter triathlon
3rd World Championships (Säter) - long distance 
1st Groningen - speedman
1st Obernai - triathlon
1st Dutch national championships (Nieuwkoop) - half triathlon
1st Paderborn - triathlon
2nd 's Gravenvoeren - cycle challenge
2nd European Championships (Venray) - powerman
1st Dutch national championships (Venray) - powerman
2nd Assault on the Carolinas (Spain) - 100 km cycling
8th New Zealand - ironman
5th Tauranga - half ironman

2005
3rd Obernai - triathlon
1st Dutch national championships (Nieuwkoop) - middle distance
1st Veendam - 10 kilometres
4th Saint Croix - half ironman
1st Knoxville, Tennessee - trideltalon
1st Loon - canoe triathlon
1st Groningen - run-skate-run
1st Inzell - winter triathlon
1st Venray - run-ATB-run

2006
1st Deventer - winter triathlon
9th Florida - ironman
1st Xanten - triathlon
1st Veenendaal - triathlon
1st Utrecht - sprint triathlon
1st Dutch national championships - long distance
1st Dutch national championships (Nieuwkoop) - middle distance
1st Obernai - triathlon
1st Ter Aar - quarter triathlon
1st Enschede - super sprint

2007
1st Muscat - sprint triathlon

References

External links
 Official website

1976 births
Living people
Dutch female triathletes
Duathletes
People from De Wolden
Sportspeople from Drenthe